Nagoya, officially Lubuk Baja, is a district (kecamatan) in Batam, Indonesia, covering 11.426 square kilometers. The population was 80,780 in 2010 Census. However, like other fastest growing cities, Batam Island is becoming a continuous urban sprawl, making its districts denser.

History
The town was dubbed "Nagoya" after the Japanese city by Japanese engineers from the Taisei Corporation, who came to Batam in the 1970s to work on infrastructure projects.

Governance

The district (kecamatan) of Lubuk Baja, Batam, is divided into five villages (desa or kelurahan). These are:
 Kelurahan Baloi Indah
 Kelurahan Batu Selicin
 Kelurahan Lubuk Baja Kota
 Kelurahan Kampung Pelita
 Kelurahan Tanjung Uma

Economy

Most of the district's income comes from its business, entertainment, and tourism sector. The best known building is Nagoya Hill Mall, the biggest shopping mall in the district. As a shopping area, it attracts many tourists and locals across the city every week.

The other main sector is the food business. Nagoya is known for its food quality and diversity, ranging from local cuisine to popular fast food restaurants, mostly in the mall.

Nagoya is also home to many shopping stores and retails. Home appliance stores, fashion boutiques, and electronic stores are common in the area, mostly concentrated in the mall and its surroundings.

Most of its tourism comes from hotels. There are numerous hotels in this district, ranging from 2 to 4-star.

The Nagoya Entertainment District (NED) consists of bars, massage parlors, clubs, hotels, and brothels.

References

External links 

Populated places in the Riau Islands
Red-light districts in Indonesia